Vado may refer to:

Places

Italy
Vado Ligure, Italy
F.C. Vado, Italian association football club 
Sant'Angelo in Vado,  in the Italian region Marche
Santa Maria in Vado, Ferrara Ferrara, Region of Emilia-Romagna

Spanish "ford"
Vado, New Mexico
Toral de los Vados, Spain
El Vado Lake, reservoir located in Rio Arriba County, in northern New Mexico
Vado Ancho, municipality in the Honduran department of El Paraíso
El Vado Dam on the Rio Chama in the U.S. state of New Mexico

People
Vado (rapper) (born 1985), American hip hop recording artist
Vado (Portuguese footballer) (born 1969)
Juan del Vado (1625–1691), Spanish composer
Dan Vado (born 1959), comic book publisher and writer

Brands
Creative Vado, pocket video cameras developed and manufactured by Creative Labs

See also
One Dollar Too Many (redirect from Vado, vedo e sparo), film
Any Gun Can Play (redirect from Vado... l'ammazzo e torno), 1967 spaghetti western